Gentiana frigida is a small flowering plant of the genus Gentiana, native to the Carpathian Mountains and eastern Alps.

frigida
Flora of the Alps
Flora of the Carpathians